St Brevita's Church, Lanlivery is a Grade I listed parish church in the Church of England in Lanlivery, Cornwall.

History
The church dates from the late 14th century, but most dates from the 15th century. The tower at 95 ft dominates the valley. The dedication to Saint Bryvyth or Brevita is unique, and nothing else is known about this saint.

Parish status
The church is in a joint benefice with:
Boconnoc Church
St Winnow's Church, St Winnow
St Cyricius and St Julietta's Church, St Veep
St Mary the Virgin's Church, Braddock
St Nectan's Chapel, St Winnow
St Bartholomew's Church, Lostwithiel

Memorials
There are many memorials to the Kendalls of Pelyn whose house is near the village.
Jane Kendall (d. 1643)
Joan Kendall (d. 1675)
Penelope Kendall (d. 1687)
Walter Kendall (d. 1696)
Nicholas Kendall (d. 1739)
Hugh Littleton (d. 1740)
Mary Fletcher (d. 1754)
Thomas Littleton (d. 1760)
Mary Collins (d. 1781)
T.W. Kendall (d. 1798)
Anne Wynter (d. 1835) by J. Theakston
Nicholas Kendall (d. 1844)

Organ
The organ dated from 1888 and was originally installed in Methodist Central Hall in St Blazey. It was moved here in 1994. A specification of the organ can be found in the National Pipe Organ Register.

Bells
The tower contains a peal of 8 bells.

References

Lanlivery
Lanlivery